

Qualification summary

Qualification timeline

-60kg Men

60-66kg Men

66-73kg Men

73-81kg Men

81-90kg Men

90-100kg Men

+100kg Men

-48kg Women

48-52kg Women

52-57kg Women

57-63kg Women

63-70kg Women

70-78kg Women

+78kg Women

* That if an athlete from China finishes in the top 6 at the worlds, their qualification place will go to the Judo union of Asia. also two additional places will be awarded to this union, but gender and weight categories are to be defined.

** 20 invitational places in total.

References

 List of Participation in Olympic Games

Qualification for the 2008 Summer Olympics
Qualification
2008